Janmadata (2008) is a Bengali family drama film directed by Swapan Saha.

Cast
 Ranjit Mullick as Durgacharan Singha
 Razzak as Bhavani Chowdhury
 Jisshu Sengupta as CBI Officer Raj Sinha, previously an orphan who was provided shelter by Bhavani when he was young, Bhavani's adoptive grandson
 Rachana Banerjee as Sima, Raj's love interest, Durga and Bhavani's real granddaughter
 Tapas Paul as retired constable Iqbal
 Laboni Sarkar as Durgacharan's wife
 Abhishek Chatterjee as Durgacharan's son, Sima's father
 Locket Chatterjee as Rina Singha (née Chowdhury)- Bhavani's daughter, Sima's mother
 Rajesh Sharma (actor) as Subal Da
 Shankar Chakraborty as Shibnath
 Anamika Saha as Durgacharan's mother, Sima's paternal great-grandmother
 Rita Koiral as Durgacharan's sister
 Anuradha Ray as Bhavani's wife
 Dolon Roy as Durgacharan's late daughter, killed by Subol
 Unknown as Bhavani's late son, killed by Sibnath
 Kanchan Mullick as Raj's friend
 Kaushik Banerjee as son-in-law of Singha house
 Shyamal Dutta as Police Commissioner

References

External links
 
 gomolo.in

2008 films
2000s Bengali-language films
Bengali-language Indian films
Films directed by Swapan Saha
Indian family films